"Kokoro" is South Korean boy band SS501's debut Japanese maxi single.

The group debuted in the Japanese market after only two years since their Korean debut to further spread their activities and challenge themselves outside of Korea. They released their Japanese single "Kokoro", alongside multiple versions, including one with all members and five featuring each member individually.

Their lead track, "Kokoro" debuted at the 5th spot on the Oricon chart, and moved to 3rd spot the next day. It was also chosen as an ending theme song for an anime entitled Blue Dragon.

Track listing

 NOTE: For the limited editions, "Alice" and its instrumental version are replaced by the solo song and its instrumental version of each member.

Music videos
 "Kokoro"

Release history

References

External links

 
 

SS501 songs
2007 singles
2007 songs
Pony Canyon singles